Linda MacNeil (born 1954) is an American abstract artist, sculptor, and jeweler. She works with glass and metal specializing in contemporary jewelry that combines metalwork with glass to create wearable sculpture. Her focus since 1975 has been sculptural objets d’art and jewelry, and she works in series. MacNeil’s jewelry is considered wearable sculpture and has been her main focus since 1996. 

MacNeil is married to American glass sculptor, Dan Dailey. “MacNeil’s artistic relationship with her husband is distinguished between their very different aesthetic approaches to glass as medium. Dailey is known for his often witty use of glass in narrative constructions. MacNeil is more abstract, allowing the material to be itself. It is a philosophical divide between the celebration of form and materiality and the championing of human intellectual vector as applied to the material”

It is noted that MacNeil is “A master metalsmith in every respect. MacNeil focusses on jewelry which allows her to create wearable sculpture.” Modern Magazine, and  “Linda is considered one of America’s foremost jewelry artists, a reputation earned through her emphasis on imagination and technical virtuosity.” The Mint Museum, Sculptural Radiance exhibition. The impact of her work is acknowledged, “the development of this innovative jeweler’s stunning aesthetic and her position within the history of jewelry and adornment enhances both the fields of glass and jewelry.”

Early life and education
Linda MacNeil was born on April 14, 1954 in Amesbury, Massachusetts, and raised in Farmingham, a suburb in greater Boston, Massachusetts. Her parents were George Ellis MacNeil, a mechanical engineer; and Nancy Dean MacNeil, a national skiwear designer. MacNeil's maternal grandfather Robert Charles Dean (1903–1997), was a great influence in her life and work and he worked as an architect. MacNeil’s design-orientated family encouraged her to be creative. When she first took an interest in jewelry, while still in high school, her father built her first workshop in the basement of their home in Hanover, New Hampshire with a simple bench and one little buffer.

MacNeil studied at the Philadelphia College of Art (now known as the University of the Arts), and the Massachusetts College of Art and Design. She received her BFA degree in 1976 from the Rhode Island School of Design (RISD). At RISD, MacNeil studied in the jewelry and light metals department headed by Professor John “Jack” Prip. He was a major influence on her work, “Jack taught me a beautiful way of softening the hardness of a geometric idea and to keep with it a conceptual idea that is different and my own.” The Rhode Island School of Design Museum has in its permanent collection the work, Neck Collar No.4 (1988). MacNeil interned with Japanese American Jeweler, Miye Matsukata at the Haystack Mountain School of Crafts.

MacNeil was introduced to glass as a medium at the Massachusetts College of Art and Design by her future husband, the glass and metal sculptor Dan Dailey.

Career 

MacNeil sets great store by the "wearability" of her pieces as well as on perfect execution.  MacNeil individually casts and hand carves or otherwise manipulates each of the glass elements in her neck pieces, ear rings and brooches. Art Jewelry Today published in 2003, identifies MacNeil as a pioneer in the use of glass in contemporary jewelry, while making reference to historic precedents. An interview with MacNeil in 2013 on Art Jewelry Forum references her interest in Art Deco, specifically the work of René Lalique.

One of the glass making techniques MacNeil employs is lost wax casting with pâte de verre (see Nile Grass below) to create intricate shapes with great surface detail. Her work was chosen as an example of this technique, which was very popular in the nineteenth century Art Deco movement, by Jeffrey B. Snyder in Art Jewelry Today 2

From 1975 to 2020, MacNeil has exhibited in 28 solo exhibitions across the U.S and Canada and over 180 group exhibitions (135 are listed below the rest on lindamacneil.com/exhibitions). In 1999, she was invited to be part of an Artists Program at Waterford Crystal Company - there she started her Waterford series / Lotus series.

MacNeil has been featured in many international group exhibitions including the Museum of Arts and Design GlassWear exhibition in 2009, "an international contemporary art exhibition celebrating the marriage of two of the richest and most inventive areas in today’s decorative arts—glass and jewelry. Organized jointly by the Museum of Arts and  Design and the Schmuckmuseum, Pforzheim, Germany. [...] The exhibition displays highly innovative glass creations by the  world’s leading jewelry artists, including Linda MacNeil and..."

MacNeil’s earliest works were mostly objects in silver - vases and vessels and small sculptures. The Bell with Stand, 1974, sculpture created while at RISD was acquired in 2021 and is now in the permanent collection at The Metal Museum in Memphis, TN. Many of MacNeil’s jewelry pieces are in museum collections around the world including the Metropolitan Museum, New York,  Smithsonian American Art Museum, Washington, National Gallery of Australia, and the V&A in London.

MacNeil became a member of the American Jewelry Design Council (AJDC) in 2011. She created and led their exhibition committee and then later accepted the role of president of the organization for a term from 2019-2021. 

In 2020 her “Primavera” necklace won the Saul Bell Design Award in the category of metals and alternative materials.

MacNeil and her husband Dan Dailey live and work in New Hampshire. They have two children.

Work

Work influences and characteristics 
Geometric forms are dominant in MacNeil’s work. “My brain thinks in a very geometric way.”— MacNeil interview for AJDC.  In 2002 a book was published, United in Beauty: The Jewelry and Collectors of Linda MacNeil with portraits of eighty women wearing pieces created by MacNeil. In the introductory essay, Helen W. Drutt English notes: 'Like Olaf Skoogfors and Toni Goessler-Snyder before her, she can claim to be a constructivist whose passion for geometric forms allows her to create works that are compositions in themselves'

Both MacNeil and her husband Dan are influenced by the Decorative Arts and in particular Art Deco building surface details. Other pieces use polished Vitriolite (see Elements below), a dense, opaque, industrial glass made prior to the 1940s, often in pieces that are a reinterpretation of Art Deco; some, such as the Lucent Lines series (see below), use acid-polished glass with gold connecting rods drilled through using the visual distortions of glass to create shifting geometric patterns.

Some rigid collars from the late 1980s and early 1990s were inspired in part by Bronze Age Celtic neckpieces and Egyptian jewelry while others again reference the Art Deco period.

Color and its interplay with light is the other major factor in her work and this is why glass takes center stage because MacNeil can manipulate and control its translucence, transparency, reflectivity, color and texture, completely. (reference total control quote) Each glass jewel she creates is totally unique. Kate Dobbs Ariail writing in Metalsmith about the Mint Museum of Craft & Design's exhibit; "Sculptural Radiance: The Jewelry and Objects of Linda MacNeil" notes that "MacNeil evidences an unusually nuanced appreciation of her material. Her use of a variety of types of glass, along with various finishing techniques, gives her an unexpectedly broad palette of hue, value, tint and reflectivity, so that her crisp design takes on a painterly tone."

The physical scale of MacNeil works is determined by its relationship with the body. An article exploring MacNeil’s work highlights scale, “Monumentality in art, as Andre Malraux famously implied through his concept of the Musée Imaginaire, […] is not necessarily dependent on the actual size of an object.”

Materials and techniques

Vitrolite 
Vintage and Modern Plate Glass Art Jewelry Today published in 2003, identifies MacNeil as a pioneer in the use of glass in contemporary jewelry, while making reference to historic precedents. While at college, MacNeil and Dailey spent summers traveling across the United States collecting Vitrolite. Vitrolite is structural pigmented plate glass. It was produced between 1908 and 1947 first by The Vitrolite Company then by Libbey Owens Ford Glass of Toledo.  It was made in distinctive opaque colors and is a rare, finite material. MacNeil combines this vintage glass with contemporary glass to create unique jewels. (eg Mesh No.132, 2012, Brooch No.81, 2013, Plate Glass Vessel, No.5, 1983, Hand Mirror, No15, 1981)

Metal  
MacNeil’s earliest works were made in pewter or silver - vases and vessels and small sculptures eg Pewter Vessel 1975. The Bell with Stand, 1974 was brass and is in permanent collection of The Metal Museum, Memphis. Early jewelry was also silver, but she then moved to plating brass with gold, or rhodium using stock and metal rods, and silver soldering.

Diamonds 
"Linda MacNeil makes glass a central element in her elegant and meticulously conceived jewelry, setting [glass] components in gold, silver, and industrial metals as if these non-precious bits of glass were gemstones. In her Necklace, (from the Elements Series, 2006),  MacNeil uses clear, polished glass “gemstones” to draw the viewer’s attention, while traditional diamonds serve a visually supporting role." - The MAD Museum

Techniques 
MacNeil introduces pattern into her work through three processes, Diamond Cut, Kiln Cast and a Stencil Sandblasting process and takes her inspiration from building surfaces, facades, tiles and textiles, Art Deco, Lalique and Egyptian Art   A glass making technique MacNeil employs is lost wax casting with Fritt to create intricate shapes with great surface detail. Her work was chosen as an example of this technique, which was very popular in the nineteenth century Art Deco movement, by Jeffrey B. Snyder in Art Jewelry Today To create some of her more organic pieces MacNeil has used fritting as a technique that creates bubbles within the glass. The size of the bubbles can be controlled as can the quantity.

Gallery

Series, start dates
Working in series, MacNeil develops a concept in a repeated way across time. As in music, variations on a theme enable deeper exploration of the imagination. MacNeil always has many ideas for the way a concept can go and makes each piece in the series a development of the original concept. Many of MacNeil’s series have persisted over decades and are still developing today.

Jewelry series 
Elements, late 1970s
Lucent Lines, 1980s
Neck collars, 1980's
Capsules, late 1980s
Waterford Series, (Ram's Horn and Lotus) 1990s
Mesh Series, 1990s
Nexus Series, late 1990s
Brooch Series, since 1998
Floral Series, 2000's
Mirrored Glass Series, 1990s

Objets D’Art, start date 

 Hand Mirror Series, 1979
 Pate de Verre Vessel Series, 1983
 Plate Glass Vessel Series, 1982
 Abstract Vessel Series, 1984
 Plate Glass Vase Series, 1982
 Suspended Parallel Series, 1986
 Tri-Form Construction Series, 1986

Public museum collections
American Jewelry Design Council, Hermitage, Pennsylvania
Cleveland Museum of Art, Cleveland, Ohio
Corning Museum of Glass, Corning, New York
Currier Museum of Art, Manchester, New Hampshire
Detroit Institute of Art, Detroit, Michigan
Fuller Craft Museum, Brockton, Massachusetts
Gemological Institute of America, Carlsbad, California
Henry Ford Museum of American Innovation, Dearborn, Michigan
Los Angeles County Museum of Art
Les Archives de la Cristallerie Daum, Nancy and Paris, France
Metropolitan Museum of Art, New York City, New York
Metal Museum, Memphis, TN
Mint Museum, Charlotte, North Carolina
Museum of Arts and Design (formerly known as the American Craft Museum), New York City, New York
Montreal Museum of Fine Arts, Montreal, Quebec, Canada
Museum of Fine Arts, Houston, Houston, Texas
Museum of Fine Arts, Boston, Boston, Massachusetts
National Liberty Museum, Philadelphia, Pennsylvania
National Gallery of Australia, Canberra, Australia
Philadelphia Museum of Art, Philadelphia, Pennsylvania
Racine Art Museum, Racine, Wisconsin
Renwick Gallery, Smithsonian American Art Museum, Washington, D.C.
Rhode Island School of Design Museum, Providence, Rhode Island
Smithsonian American Art Museum, Washington, D.C.
J. B. Speed Art Museum, Louisville, Kentucky
Toledo Museum of Art, Toledo, Ohio
Victoria and Albert Museum, London, England

Exhibitions 
This is a select list of exhibitions by MacNeil

Solo exhibitions 

 2017 Museum of Glass, Tacoma, Washington, Linda MacNeil “Jewels of Glass” ( exh.catalog)
 2013 Mobilia Gallery, Cambridge, Massachusetts, Brooches (exh. brochure) Sandra Ainsley Gallery, Toronto (parallel solo show for Dan Dailey)
 2012 Dane Gallery, Nantucket, Massachusetts, Floral Jewelry: Glass and Precious Metal Jewelry
 2011 Habatat Galleries, West Palm Beach, Florida, New Body of Work by Dan Dailey and Linda MacNeil
 2010 Mobilia Gallery, Cambridge, Massachusetts, Recent Jewelry (exh. brochure) Schantz Galleries Contemporary Glass, Stockbridge, Massachusetts, Elements of Style: The Sculptural Jewelry of Linda MacNeil (exh. brochure)
 2009 Habatat Galleries, Tysons Corner, Virginia (parallel solo show for Dan Dailey) SOFA West: Santa Fe 2009: Sculpture Objects & Functional Art Fair (with Dan Dailey at Scott Jacobson Gallery) (exh. cat.)
 2007 Hawk Galleries, Columbus, Ohio (parallel solo show for Dan Dailey)
 2005 Habatat Galleries, Boca Raton, Florida, Linda MacNeil: Glass & Gold (parallel solo show for Dan Dailey)
 2003 Mint Museum of Craft + Design, Charlotte, North Carolina, Sculptural Radiance: The Jewelry & Objects of Linda MacNeil
 2001 Habatat Galleries, Boca Raton, Florida (parallel solo show for Dan Dailey) Riley Hawk Galleries, Columbus and Cleveland, Ohio, and Kirkland, Washington, Joint Exhibition: Dan Dailey, The Expressive Figure/ Solid Gold & Precious Jewelry of Linda MacNeil South Shore Art Center, Cohasset, Massachusetts, Art in Glass & Metal: Dan Dailey and Linda MacNeil (exh. brochure)
 2000 Paul Mellon Arts Center Gallery, Choate Rosemary Hall, Wallingford, Connecticut, Jewelry (parallel solo show for Dan Dailey)
 1999 Riley Hawk Galleries, Kirkland, Washington The Art Center in Hargate, St. Paul’s School, Concord, New Hampshire, Dan Dailey and Linda MacNeil: Art in Glass and Metal (exh. cat. and video)
 1998 Riley Hawk Galleries, Cleveland and Columbus, Ohio (parallel solo show for Dan Dailey)
 1997 Habatat Galleries, Boca Raton, Florida, New Work (parallel solo show for Dan Dailey)
 1996 Riley Hawk Galleries, Cleveland and Columbus, Ohio, New Work (parallel solo show for Dan Dailey)
 1995–96 Imago Galleries, Palm Desert, California (parallel solo show for Dan Dailey)
 1995 Habatat Galleries, Boca Raton, Florida (parallel solo show for Dan Dailey) Vespermann Gallery, Atlanta, Special Collection of Linda MacNeil Glass Necklaces (parallel solo show for Dan Dailey)
 1993 Riley Hawk Galleries, Cleveland and Columbus, Ohio (parallel solo show for Dan Dailey)
 1991 Riley Hawk Galleries, Cleveland and Columbus, Ohio (parallel solo show for Dan Dailey)
 1988 Helen Drutt Gallery, Philadelphia
 1987 Helen Drutt Gallery, Philadelphia, Contemporary Jewelry
 1986 Anne O’Brien Gallery, Washington, DC, Constructed Vessels and Jewelry
 1985 Heller Gallery, New York, Glass Sculpture (parallel solo show for Dan Dailey)
 1984 Habatat Galleries, Bay Harbor Islands, Florida (parallel solo show for Dan Dailey)
 1983 David Bernstein Gallery, Boston Kurland/Summers Gallery, Los Angeles
 1981 Habatat Galleries, Lathrup Village, Michigan, Pyramidal Vessels (parallel solo show for Dan Dailey) (exh. brochure)
 1980 Julie: Artisans’ Gallery, New York, Glass and Metal Hand Mirrors
 1979 Ten Arrow Gallery, Cambridge, Massachusetts, Glass Jewelry Combined with Precious Metals

Group exhibitions 
 2018-19 Museum of Arts and Design, New York, “MAD Collects: The Future of Crafts Part 1”; Lowe Art Museum, Florida, “Collection of Florence and Robert Werner” (Exh cat); Gallery 2052 Chicago, Illinois, “Mastery in Jewelry and Metals, Irresistible Offerings”, curated by Gail Brown for the Society of North American Goldsmith’s. (exh.brochure.);
 2016-17 Los Angeles County Museum of Art, “The Boardman Collection: Beyond Bling” (exh. cat.);
 2016 Glass Pavilion, Toledo Museum of Art, Toledo, Ohio, Hot Spot: Contemporary Glass from Private Collections;
 2015–16 Racine Art Museum, Racine, Wisconsin, Standing on Ceremony: Functional Ware from RAM’s Collection (exh. brochure);
 2015 A Journey Through Time: Explorations of Artful Adornment & Sculptural Vessels Through the Ages Museum of Arts and Design, New York, Jewelry curated by Isabel and Ruben Toledo in Ralph Pucci: The Art of the Mannequin (exh. cat., not in catalogue);
 2014 Mint Museum Uptown, Charlotte, North Carolina, Allure of Flowers: Botanical Motifs in Craft, Design, and Fashion (organized by The Mint Museum) New Britain Museum of American Art, New Britain, Connecticut, Glass Today: 21st-Century Innovations (exh. cat.);
 2013–16 The Forbes Gallery, New York (organized by the American Jewelry Design Council), Variations on a Theme: 25 Years of Designs from the AJDC (exh. cat.; traveled to Alumni Gallery, Kent State University Museum, Kent, Ohio; JCK Las Vegas, Las Vegas, Nevada; Gemological Institute of America, Carlsbad, California );
 2013 Pôle Bijou Galerie, Baccarat, France, Rêves de verre (exh. brochure) SOFA Art and Design Chicago;
 2012–13 Playing with Fire: 50 Years of Contemporary Glass Racine Art Museum, Racine, Wisconsin, The Cutting Edge: RAM Honors 50 Years of Studio Art Glass Jewelry (exh. brochure);
 2010–11 The Montreal Museum of Fine Arts, Studio Glass: Anna and Joe Mendel Collection (exh. cat.)
 2010 Jewelry & Functional Art Racine Art Museum, Racine, Wisconsin, A Glass Act: First Rate Glass from RAM’s Collection SOFA Chicago 2010: Kentucky Museum of Art and Craft, Louisville, Glass Jewelry: An International Passion;
 2008–2009 Museum of Arts and Design, New York, Elegant Armor: The Art of Jewelry (exh. cat.);
 2007–10 Glass Pavilion, Toledo Museum of Art, Toledo, Ohio (organized by Museum of Arts & Design, New York, and Schmuckmuseum Pforzheim, Pforzheim, Germany), GlassWear: Glass in Contemporary Jewelry (exh. cat.; traveled to Glazen Huis Vlaams Centrum voor Hedendaagse Glaskunst, Lommel, Belgium; Art Museum of South Texas, Corpus Christi; Memorial Art Gallery—University of Rochester, Rochester, New York;
 2006–2009 Helen Drutt: Philadelphia, and Designmuseo, Helsinki, Challenging the Châtelaine! (exh. cat.; traveled to Tarbekunstimuuseum, Tallinn, Estonia; Lalaounis Jewelry Museum, Athens; Design Museum, Ghent, Belgium; Stedelijk Museum ’s-Hertogenbosch,’s-Hertogenbosch, the Netherlands; Philadelphia Art Alliance);
 2005 Charles A. Wustum Museum of Fine Arts, Racine, Wisconsin (organized by Racine Art Museum), Magnificent Extravagance: Artists and Opulence (exh. brochure);
 2004–2005 American Craft Museum, New York, Treasures from the Vault: Jewelry from the Permanent Collection;
 2004 Fuller Craft Museum, Brockton, Massachusetts, The Perfect Collection: A Shared Vision for Contemporary Craft (exh. cat.);
 2003–2005 Society of North American Goldsmiths, Lisle, Illinois, The Art of Gold (exh. cat.; traveled by ExhibitsUSA to Crocker Art Museum, Sacramento, California; University of Richmond Museums, Richmond, Virginia; Arkansas Arts Center, Little Rock; The Mint Museum of Craft + Design, Charlotte, North Carolina; Anchorage Museum, Alaska)
 2003–2004 Smithsonian American Art Museum, Renwick Gallery, Washington, DC, Jewels & Gems (exh. brochure);
 2002–2003 Carnegie Museum of Art, Pittsburgh, and Toledo Museum of Art, Toledo, Ohio, Contemporary Directions: Glass from the Maxine and William Block Collection (exh. cat.);
 2000–2001 Kentucky Art and Craft Foundation, Louisville, Millennium Glass: An International Survey of Studio Glass (exh. cat.; traveled to Montgomery Museum of Fine Arts, Montgomery, Alabama; Hunter Museum of American Art, Chattanooga, Tennessee)
 2000 American Craft Museum, New York, Defining Craft I;
 1999–2000 50 Years of Studio Jewelry: A Survey of Contemporary Work from the 1950s to the Present Renwick Gallery of the Smithsonian’s American Art Museum, Washington, DC, Glass! Glorious Glass! (exh. brochure);
 1998–2001 American Craft Museum, New York, Craft Is a Verb: Selections from the Collection of the American Craft Museum (traveled to Mississippi Museum of Art, Jackson; Sarah Moody Gallery, University of Alabama, Tuscaloosa; Sunrise Museum, Charleston, West Virginia; Miami University Gallery, Oxford, Ohio; Tampa Museum of Art, Tampa, Florida);
 1997 Copenhagen (co-organized with the American Craft Museum), Celebrating American Craft 1975–1995;
 1993–95 Toledo Museum of Art, Toledo, Ohio, Contemporary Crafts and the Saxe Collection (exh. cat.; traveled to The St. Louis Art Museum; Newport Harbor Art Museum, Newport Beach, California; Renwick Gallery of the National Museum of American Art, Smithsonian Institution, Washington, DC);
 1990–91 American Craft Museum, New York, Selections from the Permanent Collection;
 1989–93 American Craft Museum, New York, Craft Today USA (exh. cat.; traveled to Musée des Arts Décoratifs, Paris; Taidetollisuusmuseoi, Helsinki; Museum für Kunsthandwerk, Frankfurt; Zache˛ta State Gallery of Art, Warsaw; Musée des Arts Décoratifs, Lausanne; All-Russia Museum of Decorative, Applied and Folk Art, Moscow; State Painting and Sculpture Museum, Ankara; Kunstindustrimuseet, Oslo; St. Peter’s Abbey, Ghent; America Haus, Berlin; Zappeion, Athens; Slovak National Gallery, Bratislava; Grassi Museum, Leipzig; Sala Sant Jaume de la Fundacio “La Caixa,” Barcelona; Museu Calouste Gulbenkian, Lisbon);
 1986–88 American Craft Museum, New York, Craft Today: Poetry of the Physical (exh. cat.; traveled to The Denver Art Museum; Laguna Art Museum, Laguna Beach, California; Milwaukee Art Museum; J. B. Speed Art Museum, Louisville, Kentucky; Virginia Museum of Fine Arts, Richmond);
 1986 Bevier Gallery of Art, Rochester Institute of Technology, Rochester, New York, Architecture of the Vessel (exh. cat.);
 1985–87 American Craft Museum, New York, American Jewelry Now (exh. cat.; traveled to Thomas Jefferson Cultural Center, Makati, Philippines; Joong-Aug Gallery, Seoul; National Museum of History, Taipei; National Museum, Jakarta; National Museum, Singapore; National Museum, Kuala Lumpur; Auckland City Art Gallery; Robert McDougall Art Gallery, Christchurch, New Zealand);
 1985 Le Musée des Beaux-Arts de Rouen, France (co-organized with L’Association Renouveau du Verre en Haute-Normandie, Art du Verre: Actualité internationale (exh. cat.);
 1984–86 American Craft Museum II, New York (organized by the American Craft Museum), Jewelry USA (exh. cat.; traveled to Virginia Museum of Fine Arts, Richmond; Craft & Folk Art Museum, Los Angeles; The Chicago Public Library Cultural Center; The Oakland Museum, Oakland, California; Hunter Museum of Art, Chattanooga, Tennessee; Bass Museum of Art, Miami Beach, Florida; National Ornamental Metal Museum, Memphis; Newport Art Museum, Newport, Rhode Island);
 1983 Tucson Museum of Art, Tucson, Arizona, Sculptural Glass (exh. cat.; traveled to Owens-Illinois World Headquarters Building, Toledo, Ohio) American Embassy; Residence, Prague (organized by the Corning Museum of Glass, Corning, New York), Contemporary American Glass Sculpture (exh. cat.);
 1982–83 The Art Gallery of Western Australia, Perth, Glass: International Directions in Glass Art (exh. cat.; traveled to state art museums in Victoria, Queensland, New South Wales, and Tasmania);
 1981–84 Bass Museum of Art, Miami Beach, Florida (organized by the Smithsonian Institution Traveling Exhibition Service), Good as Gold: Alternative Materials in American Jewelry (exh. cat.; traveled to Renwick Gallery, National Museum of American Art, Smithsonian Institution, Washington, DC; Dallas Historical Society; Oglebay Institute, Wheeling, West Virginia; State University of New York (SUNY), New Paltz; San Jose Museum of Art, San Jose, California; Tacoma Art Museum, Tacoma, Washington; Daytona Beach Community College, Daytona Beach, Florida; Muskegon Museum of Art, Muskegon, Michigan; Ontario Crafts Council, Toronto; McAllen International Museum, McAllen, Texas; Leigh Yawkey Woodson Museum, Wausau, Wisconsin; University of Delaware, Newark; Museums at Sunrise, Charleston, West Virginia; Museo La Tertulia, Cali, Colombia; Binational Center, La Paz; Binational Center, Asuncíon, Paraguay; Museo Nacional de Bellas Artes, Santiago; Binational Center, Lima);
 1981–82 Leigh Yawkey Woodson Art Museum, Wausau, Wisconsin, Americans in Glass (exh. cat.; traveled to The Cooper-Hewitt Museum, The Smithsonian Institution’s National Museum of Design, New York; Krannert Art Museum, University of Illinois at Urbana-Champaign; Bergstrom Art Center and Mahler Glass Museum, Neenah, Wisconsin);
 1981 7 from Glass Routes Contemporary Artisans Gallery, San Francisco, National Glass Invitational Contemporary Artisans Gallery, San Francisco, Viewpoints, Women in Glass DeCordova Museum, Lincoln, Massachusetts, Glass Routes (exh. cat.);
 1980 Huntington Galleries, Huntington, West Virginia, 1980 Glass Art Society Exhibition Catalogue: New American Glass: Focus West Virginia (exh. cat.) Gallery of the Center for Music, Drama, and Art, Lake Placid, New York (organized for the XIII Olympic Winter Games by the Museum of Contemporary Crafts, New York, for the National Fine Arts Committee), Art for Use Palo Alto, California (organized for PORTCON ’80 conference by Glass Magazine, Portland, Oregon), Fragile Art ’80 (exh. brochure) Shelly Guggenheim, Washington, DC, Holiday Showing and Sale of Contemporary Museum-Quality Fine Art: Glass/Clay/Fiber/Jewelry University of Arizona Museum of Art, Tucson, Copper 2: The Second Copper, Brass and Bronze Exhibition (exh. cat.) University of Delaware, Newark, Art as Body Adornment (exh. cat.);
 1979 Art Gallery, Ball State University, Muncie, Indiana, Metalworks Invitational 1979 (exh. cat.) Helen Drutt Gallery, Philadelphia;
 1978 Saenger Center, University of Southern Mississippi, Hattiesburg, The Saenger National Jewelry and Small Sculpture Exhibit (exh. cat). The Creative Arts Workshop, New Haven, Connecticut, National Metalsmiths Invitational (exh. cat.);
 1977–79 The Southeastern Center for Contemporary Art, Winston-Salem, North Carolina (with The Museum of Contemporary Crafts of the American Crafts Council, New York), Young Americans: Fiber, Wood, Plastic, Leather (exh. cat.; traveled to Contemporary Arts Center, New Orleans; Huntington Galleries, Huntington, West Virginia; Jacksonville Art Museum, Jacksonville, Florida; The Norton Gallery School of Art, West Palm Beach, Florida; The Rochester Institute of Technology, Rochester, New York; The Iowa Art Center, Ames; Hunter Museum of Art, Chattanooga, Tennessee);
 1976 Bruce Gallery, Edinboro State College, Edinboro, Pennsylvania, Annual National Art Competition 1976 Intent: Jewelry/Metal Cooper & French Gallery, Newport, Rhode Island, Illuminated Glass Lever House, New York (organized by Sterling Silversmiths Guild of America), Statements in Sterling: 1976 Sterling Silver Design Competition The Grover M. Hermann Fine Arts Center, Marietta College, Marietta, Ohio, Marietta College Crafts National ’76 (exh. cat.);
 1975 Colorado State University, Fort Collins, Contemporary Crafts of the Americas (exh. cat.) Cooperstown Art Association, New York, 40th Annual Art Exhibition;

References

External links 

 LindaMacneil.com
 Helen W. Drutt English bio

1954 births
Living people
American glass artists
Women glass artists
American goldsmiths
American jewellers
University of the Arts (Philadelphia) alumni
Women metalsmiths
Women jewellers